Lesbian, gay, bisexual, and transgender (LGBT) people in Somalia face legal challenges not experienced by non-LGBT residents. Being LGBT is highly illegal in Somalia; same-sex sexual activity is punishable by up to death in areas controlled by Al-Shabab as well as in Jubaland. LGBT persons are regularly prosecuted by the government and additionally face stigmatization among the broader population.

Legality of same-sex sexual activity

Italian East Africa 
In 1940, Italy conquered British Somaliland and annexed it into the Italian East Africa. While Italy didn't have sodomy laws since 1890, the Fascist regime still punished homosexuals. In 1941, the British reconquered British Somaliland and re-instated their sodomy laws.

British Somali Coast Protectorate
Prior to independence from the British, the Indian Penal Code of 1860 was applied in British Somali Coast protectorate.

Somali Republic 
In 1964, a new penal code came into force in the Somali Republic. The code states that "Whoever has carnal intercourse with a person of the same sex shall be punished, where the act does not constitute a more serious crime, with imprisonment from three months to three years. Where the act committed is an act of lust different from carnal intercourse, the punishment imposed shall be reduced by one-third." The code has since been abolished by the United Kingdom after seeing it as one of the most discriminating laws crafted by a former world power. The United Kingdom has since then legalized homosexuality, civil partnership, and same-sex marriage.

Somali Democratic Republic 
Under Article 409 of the Somali Penal Code introduced in 1973, sexual intercourse with a person of the same sex is punishable by imprisonment from three months to three years. An "act of lust" other than sexual intercourse is punishable by a prison term of two months to two years. Under Article 410 of the Somali Penal Code, an additional security measure may accompany sentences for homosexual acts, usually coming in the form of police surveillance to prevent "re-offending".
Extrajudicial executions are tolerated.

Federal Government of Somalia

HIV/AIDS prevention 
Family planning services are hard to access, as is fact-based information on human sexuality. Humanitarian workers have stated that Islamic social mores often make it difficult to publicly talk about how the virus can be spread. Since 1999, much of the AIDS/HIV education and care has come from international organizations such as the United Nations.

Despite this, Somalia and neighbouring Ethiopia has one of the lowest HIV infection rates on the continent.  While the estimated HIV prevalence rate in Somalia in 1987 (the first case report year) was 1% of adults, a more recent estimate from 2007 now places it at only 0.5% of the nation's adult population.

LGBT organizations 

As of 2004, one group reportedly existed for LGBT people in Somalia. However lots of Somali immigrants have formed majority Somali or even solely Somali LGBT organizations in Canada.

Civil war 

In territories controlled by Harakat al-Shabaab al-Mujahideen in Somalia, the terrorist organization enacts a strict interpretation of shariah which explicitly outlaws homosexuality. The punishment for those found guilty is at a judge's discretion and may be punished by death.

HIV prevalence by region

Living conditions 
The U.S. Department of State's 2010 Human Rights Report found that "sexual orientation was considered a gay topic, and there was no public discussion of this issue in any region of the country," and that "there were reports of societal violence or discrimination based on sexual orientation."

Summary table

See also 

 LGBT rights in Africa
 LGBT rights in Somaliland
 Human rights in Somalia
 Death penalty for homosexuality

References

Further reading

External links 
"Soulmates: The Price of Being Gay in Somalia" Afrol News
Ali, Noor. "Gay Somali refugees face death threats." (Archive) Al Jazeera. 7 July 2013.

Somalia
Law of Somalia
Human rights in Somalia
LGBT in Somalia
Somalia